The Wall Township Public Schools are a comprehensive community public school district that serves students in pre-kindergarten through twelfth grade from Wall Township, in Monmouth County, New Jersey, United States.

As of the 2020–21 school year, the district, comprised of seven schools, had an enrollment of 3,319 students and 377.1 classroom teachers (on an FTE basis), for a student–teacher ratio of 8.8:1.

The district is classified by the New Jersey Department of Education as being in District Factor Group "GH", the third-highest of eight groupings. District Factor Groups organize districts statewide to allow comparison by common socioeconomic characteristics of the local districts. From lowest socioeconomic status to highest, the categories are A, B, CD, DE, FG, GH, I and J.

Schools
Schools in the district (with 2020–21 enrollment data from the National Center for Education Statistics) are:
Special education
Wall Primary School with 51 students in grades PreK
Erin Embon, Principal
Elementary schools
Allenwood Elementary School with 402 students in grades K-5
Dr. Erin O'Connell, Principal
Central Elementary School with 495 students in grades K-5
Efstratios Monafis, Acting Principal
Old Mill Elementary School with 357 students in grades K-5
Jill Antoniello, Principal
West Belmar Elementary School with 116981 students in grades K-5
Anthony Abeal, Principal
Middle school
Wall Intermediate School with 777 students in grades 6–8
Eric Laughlin, Principal
High school
Wall High School with 1,052 students in grades 9–12
Dr. Tracy Handerhan, Acting Principal

Administration
Core members of the district's administration are:
Dr. Tracy Handerhan, Superintendent
Brian Smyth, Business Administrator / Board Secretary

Board of education
The district's board of education, comprised of nine members, sets policy and oversees the fiscal and educational operation of the district through its administration. As a Type II school district, the board's trustees are elected directly by voters to serve three-year terms of office on a staggered basis, with three seats up for election each year held (since 2012) as part of the November general election. The board appoints a superintendent to oversee the district's day-to-day operations and a business administrator to supervise the business functions of the district.

References

External links 

School Data for the Wall Township Public Schools, National Center for Education Statistics

Wall Township, New Jersey
New Jersey District Factor Group GH
School districts in Monmouth County, New Jersey